The 63d Expeditionary Signal Battalion is headquartered and located on Fort Gordon, however relocating to Fort Stewart, Georgia and is a subordinate unit of the 35th Theater Tactical Signal Brigade. On order, 63d Expeditionary Signal Battalion rapidly deploys worldwide to Engineer, Install, Operate, Maintain, and Defend the LandWarNet in support of Full Spectrum Operations. The battalion's motto "From the Beginning!" comes from its involvement at the start of US operations in World War II.

Deployments
The battalion has deployed soldiers through its history to Europe and Asia. Most recently, in December 2012 and May 2014 soldiers deployed to Asia.

History
The history of the 63rd Signal Battalion began when it was constituted in the Regular Army on July 1, 1940, and later activated on June 1, 1941, at Camp Claiborne, LA. The battalion was reorganized and redesignated the 63rd Signal Operations Battalion March 1, 1945, while in Europe. The battalion was subsequently inactivated June 20, 1948, in Austria.

The 63rd reentered the active force April 1, 1950, while in Austria. On October 1, 1952, the battalion was reorganized and redesignated the 63rd Signal Battalion.

On September 10, 1955, the unit was again inactivated.

Headquarters and Headquarters Company, 63rd Signal Battalion, was reactivated July 24, 1967, at Fort Riley, Kansas; spent March 1970-January 1972 at Camp Evans, northwest of Huế, Republic of Vietnam, and was inactivated February 15, 1972, at Fort Lewis, Washington.

On July 1, 1975, the 63rd was redesignated the Headquarters and Headquarters Detachment, 63rd Signal Battalion. The unit was activated while in Germany, where it remained until inactivation September 1, 1977.

The battalion next entered active service on October 1, 1984, when it was reorganized and redesignated the Headquarters and Headquarters Company, 63rd Signal Battalion. The unit was activated in Massweiler, Germany. Companies A and B were concurrently activated.

On April 15, 1989, the battalion was reorganized and redesignated an Army Area Signal Battalion. On April 15, 1990, Company E, 67th Signal Battalion, and Company F, 16th Signal Battalion were redesignated Company C and Company D, 63rd Signal Battalion, respectively.

During Operations Desert Storm/Desert Shield, 63rd Signal Battalion installed, operated and maintained a significant portion of what was, at that time, the largest, most technically complex Echelon Above Corps communication network ever developed.

After serving in Desert Shield and Desert Storm, the restationing of the 63rd Signal Battalion from the 7th Signal Brigade in Europe to a new home station at Fort Gordon, Georgia, was announced on 12 November 1991. The battalion was assigned to the 11th Signal Brigade, effective March 16, 1992. The 63rd deployed companies into Somalia in 1992 and 1993 in support of U.S. humanitarian and peace keeping operations.

Effective February 19, 1998, the 63rd Signal Battalion was reassigned from the 11th Signal Brigade, Fort Huachuca, Arizona, to the 93rd Signal Brigade, Fort Gordon, Georgia.

The resolve of 63rd Signal Battalion was challenged once again when it was called into action for Operations Enduring Freedom and Iraqi Freedom in Southwest Asia on February 16, 2003. On G+1, the 63rd crossed into Iraq with the 3rd Infantry Division and the 1st MEF and emplaced signal support stretching from Kuwait to as far north as Baghdad and Fallujah, Iraq. Some of the many sites the 63rd supported were Camp Arifjan, Camp Virginia, Camp Victory, Cedar I and II, Tallil Air Base, LSA Bushmaster, LSA Resolute, Camp Bucca Theater Internment Facility, Basra International Airport, Baghdad International Airport, and two former Iraqi Presidential Palaces. In January 2004, the 63rd conducted a relief in place and transition of authority with the 67th Signal Battalion. After successfully deploying and accomplishing the mission, the 63rd brought every soldier home to Fort Gordon, Georgia, on February 19, 2004.

The 63rd Signal Battalion deployed again in January 2005 in support of the Combined Forces Land Component Commander (CFLCC) during Operation IRAQI FREEDOM III. The battalion provided all communications support for Kuwait and provided CFLCC on call contingency communications capabilities. The battalion served as Kuwait DOIM, the Area Support Group Kuwait (ASG Kuwait) S6, and the SYSCON for Kuwait and Southern Iraq. The battalion provided communications to over 40,000 permanent subscribers in Kuwait and to 150,000 subscribers during the 2005 surge operations. The 63rd served as the force provider headquarters for all signal infrastructure projects across Kuwait, Iraq, and Afghanistan providing the command and control of an additional seven signal companies to meet these requirements. After successfully completing the mission, the soldiers of the 63rd once again safely redeployed home to Fort Gordon, Georgia, on January 19, 2006.

In March 2010 Charlie Company deployed for a 12-month rotation to Afghanistan, with the company being dispursed on FOB Shank, FOB Ghazni, FOB Sharana and Baghram Airfield. Charlie Company was under the command of the 25th Signal Battalion headquartered at Bagram Airfield and provided support during the unit's 12-month rotation. Charlie Company redeployed and reintegrated with the 63rd Expeditionary Signal Battalion in March 2011

On Dec 7th 2012 soldiers from Charlie Company deployed to Iraq, to support main backbone communications with their troposphere communications platforms. They spent 9 months providing service and returned home in September 2013

May 4, 2014, the 518th Tactical Installation Networking Company (TIN) deployed to Kuwait and Afghanistan, beginning a nine-month deployment. Because of the Fort Stewart move 518th was realigned under the 67th Expeditionary Signal Battalion

References

External links
 http://www.dvidshub.net/image/780174/63rd-signal-battalion-conducts-change-command
 http://chronicle.augusta.com/slideshow/2012-12-07/deployment-ceremony-63rd-expeditionary-signal-battalion#slide-1

063